ADB-FUBINACA is a designer drug identified in synthetic cannabis blends in Japan in 2013. In 2018, it was the third-most common synthetic cannabinoid identified in drugs seized by the Drug Enforcement Administration.

The (S)-enantiomer of ADB-FUBINACA is described in a 2009 Pfizer patent and has been reported to be a potent agonist of the CB1 receptor and the CB2 receptor with EC50 values of 1.2 nM and 3.5 nM, respectively. ADB-FUBINACA features a carboxamide group at the 3-indazole position, like SDB-001 and STS-135. ADB-FUBINACA appears to be the product of rational drug design, since it differs from AB-FUBINACA only by the replacement of the isopropyl group with a tert-butyl group.

An analogue of ADB-FUBINACA, ADSB-FUB-187, containing a more functionalized carboxamide substituent was recently reported.

Side effects 

One death through coronary arterial thrombosis has been linked to ADB-FUBINACA intoxication.

At least an additional 8 deaths in Hungary in 2015 are linked to the usage of this material, all deaths were youngsters below 21.

Metabolism 
Twenty-three ADB-FUBINACA major metabolites were identified in several incubations with cryopreserved human hepatocytes. Major metabolic pathways were alkyl and indazole hydroxylation, terminal amide hydrolysis, subsequent glucuronide conjugations, and dehydrogenation.

Legality
In the United States, ADB-FUBINACA is a Schedule I controlled substance.

See also 

 5F-AB-PINACA
 5F-ADB
 5F-AMB
 5F-APINACA
 AB-CHFUPYCA
 AB-PINACA
 ADB-BINACA
 ADB-CHMINACA
 ADB-PINACA
 ADBICA
 ADSB-FUB-187
 APINACA
 MDMB-CHMICA
 MDMB-FUBINACA
 PF-03550096
 PX-3

References 

Cannabinoids
Designer drugs
Fluoroarenes

Indazolecarboxamides
Tert-butyl compounds